Davichi is a South Korean pop duo formed in 2008. The duo consists of vocalists Lee Hae-ri and Kang Min-kyung. Their name, "Davichi", is derived from the Korean phrase "shining over everything" (다 비치).

The duo has released three studio albums and six extended plays to date, and featured on several soundtracks for television dramas such as Big (2012), Iris II (2013), It's Okay, That's Love (2014), Descendants of the Sun (2016) and Moon Lovers: Scarlet Heart Ryeo (2016). Since their debut with the single "I Love You Even Though I Hate You", they have experienced consistent commercial success, with seven number-one singles in Korea. They have a less pop aesthetic than usually defines K-pop and Hallyu, focusing more on power ballads influenced with R&B.

Career

2008–2010: Debut and Breakthrough

The duo released their debut studio album, Amaranth, on February 4, 2008. The promotional track "I Love You Even Though I Hate You" won the "Rookie of the Month" award for February at the Cyworld Digital Music Awards. The duo subsequently promoted the track "Sad Promise" from the album. On July 8, they released a repackaged edition of their first album titled Vivid Summer Edition, with "Love and War" as the promotional single.

In the final months of 2008, Davichi won awards for "Best New Artist" at the Mnet Asian Music Awards, Golden Disk Awards, and the Seoul Music Awards.

On March 5, 2009, Davichi released the extended play Davichi in Wonderland, with the lead single "8282". The song proved to be popular among the general public and continued Davichi's chart success.

The following year on May 6, 2010, Davichi released their second EP, Innocence, with the lead single "Time, Please Stop". The music video to the lead single featured T-ara's Eun-jung.

2011–2012: Love Delight
On August 16, 2011, it was announced that Davichi would be releasing their third extended play, Love Delight, later in the month. On August 27, it was revealed by Davichi's label, Core Contents Media, that the entire Love Delight album had been leaked on the internet. Despite the leak quickly making its way through internet portal sites, the company chose not to change the release date. Love Delight was released on August 29, along with the music video to their lead single, "Don't Say Goodbye". The song went on to chart at number one on Korea's Gaon Digital Chart and the Billboard K-Pop Hot 100 for three consecutive weeks.

On October 7, 2012, it was announced that the members of Davichi would be leaving their label to form an independent company. However, less than one month later, it was revealed that the duo had retracted their decision to leave Core Contents Media and renewed their contracts.

2013–2014: Mystic Ballad and 6,7
On March 3, 2013, the music video for the pre-release single "Turtle", from Davichi's second studio album Mystic Ballad, was released. The music video starred 5dolls's member Hyoyoung. "Turtle" went on to chart at number one on South Korea's Gaon Single Chart. On March 18, Davichi released the title track "Just the Two of Us", along with the full album, which featured collaborations with Duble Sidekick, Verbal Jint, Jung Suk-won, and Ryu Jae-hyun. Promotions for "Just the Two of Us" began on March 21 on M! Countdown. The single took the number one spot on M! Countdown, marking Davichi's fifteenth music show win.

On April 1, Davichi released the digital single "Be Warmed (feat. Verbal Jint)". The song was originally listed on the track listing for Mystic Ballad, but was taken out for unknown reasons. The song was met with instant success in South Korea. On June 27, Davichi released the digital single album Memories of Summer with the track "Because I Miss You Today", which was produced by Choi Kyu-sung.

On February 23, 2014, it was announced that Davichi's contract had expired and that a renewal of their contract with Core Contents Media seemed unlikely. It was soon later announced that the duo had indeed not re-signed, but that they would be releasing a final studio album with the company as a 'parting gift'. On June 4, Davichi released Again, featuring Kim Tae-min, Park Sang-won, and F-ve Dolls's Seunghee. On June 18, the duo released "Pillow", a previously unreleased debut song. The EP 6,7 was digitally released the day after. On July 3, Davichi released "Don't Move" as their last single under Core Contents Media, with the music video featuring T-ara N4's Dani and Speed's Sungmin.

On July 13, Davichi released It's Okay, That's Love, which was featured throughout the SBS drama It's Okay, That's Love. Shortly after that, on July 17, the duo signed an exclusive contract with CJ E&M after their contract with Core Contents Media expired.

2015–2016: Davichi Hug, 50 x Half

Davichi released new EP Davichi Hug on January 21, 2015, with the two lead singles, "Crying Again" and "Sorry, I'm Happy". The EP was released under the CJ E&M label MMO Entertainment. On December 16, they released the digital single WHITE featuring Jay Park, their first release under CJ E&M label B2M Entertainment.

On October 13, 2016, Davichi released their sixth extended play, 50 x Half with double title tracks "Beside Me" and "Love Is To Give". On October 28, Davichi announced their solo concert entitled Davichi In Tempo <50 X HALF>. Two concerts were held in Seoul at Yonsei University Grand Hall from December 30–31.

2017–present: &10, new singles, and Season Note
 
On October 11, 2017, Davichi released their digital single titled "To Me". On December 15, 2017 Davichi announced their solo concerts entitled Davichi La êve Concert 2017 would be held in Seoul at Yonsei University Grand Hall from December 23–24.

On January 16, 2018, B2M Entertainment announced that Davichi would be releasing their third studio album to celebrate their 10-year anniversary. Davichi released their third studio album &10 on January 25 with the title track "Days Without You".

Davichi released single "Unspoken Words" on May 17, 2019. The song lyrics about the heart of a woman who still misses her lover after a breakup.

Davichi released new single "Just Hug Me" on April 12, 2021.  The song was described as a mid-tempo ballad with lyrics about the woman who want her ex-lover to hug her warmly 
with a loving heart without any excuses or words at the moment we meet again after a breakup.

Davichi released new single "First Loss" on October 18, 2021.  They also released the single "Everyday Christmas" on December 6, 2021.

On May 16, 2022, Davichi released their seventh extended play, Season Note, with the lead single "Fanfare".

Concerts
Davichi 1st Concert "The Premiere" In Seoul (2009)
Davichi Christmas Concert In Seoul (2010)
Davichi Concert 'To Send' (2011)
Davichi Concert 'Davichi Code' (2013)
Davichi Concert 'Winter Hug' (2015)
Davichi In Tempo <50 X HALF> (2016)
Davichi OST & Greatest Hits Live In Singapore (2017)
Davichi La êve Concert (2017)
Davichi Live Tour '&10' (2018)
Davichi Winter Party (2018)
Davichi Concert In Taipei (2019)
Davichi Concert In LA & San Francisco (2019)
Davichi Concert ‘DAVICHI CONCERT’ (2019)

Discography

 Amaranth (2008)
 Mystic Ballad (2013)
 &10 (2018)

Awards and nominations

See also
 List of best-selling girl groups

Notes

References

External links

 

MBK Entertainment artists
Wake One Entertainment artists
South Korean contemporary R&B musical groups
Musical groups established in 2008
K-pop music groups
Musical groups from Seoul
MAMA Award winners
South Korean musical duos
Melon Music Award winners
Pop music duos
Female musical duos